Rainbow Island is a 1944 American musical comedy film directed by Ralph Murphy and written by Arthur Phillips and Walter DeLeon. The film stars Dorothy Lamour, Eddie Bracken, Gil Lamb, Barry Sullivan, Forrest Orr, Anne Revere and Reed Hadley. The film was released on September 5, 1944, by Paramount Pictures.

Plot

Cast
Dorothy Lamour as Lona
Eddie Bracken as Toby Smith
Gil Lamb as Pete Jenkins
Barry Sullivan as Ken Masters
Forrest Orr as Dr. Curtis
Anne Revere as Queen Okalana
Reed Hadley as High Priest Kahuna
Marc Lawrence as Alcoa
Adia Kuznetzoff as Executioner
Olga San Juan as Miki
Elena Verdugo as Moana

Production
Dorothy Lamour was reluctant to play the lead. Paramount was going to use contract player Yvonne De Carlo instead but then Lamour changed her mind, and De Carlo was relegated to a bit player. "You might have seen Gil Lamb chasing me through the bushes in it", said De Carlo later.

References

External links
 

1944 films
Paramount Pictures films
American musical comedy films
1944 musical comedy films
Films scored by Roy Webb
Films directed by Ralph Murphy
Films set on islands
Films set in Oceania
1940s English-language films
1940s American films